is a Japanese hurdler. He was the former Japanese national high school record holder in the 110 metres hurdles and the first Japanese high school student to run under 14 seconds. He competed in the 60 metres hurdles at the 2008 World Indoor Championships. He played soccer before switching to athletics.

He is currently the sprint coach of the track and field club at Japan Women's College of Physical Education.

Personal bests

International competitions

National titles
110 m hurdles
National Sports Festival - 2001, 2005
National Corporate Championships - 2008
National University Championships - 2003
National University Individual Championships - 2005
National Junior Championships - 2002
National High School Championships - 2001

References

External links

Yuji Ohashi at Mizuno  (archived)

1983 births
Living people
Sportspeople from Hokkaido
University of Tsukuba alumni
Japanese male hurdlers
Japanese athletics coaches